Lake Chaparral is a private gated community in Linn County, Kansas with three private lakes.

The area is experiencing great growth due to its proximity to the Kansas City Metropolitan Area and the Highway 69 corridor.

There are many other lake communities in eastern Kansas, in which city dwellers spend their weekends and holidays.

Other "Lake Chaparrals" 
Lake Chaparral is also a recreational and lake community in Calgary, Alberta.

External links 
Official websites
Lake Chaparral in Calgary, Alberta

Bodies of water of Linn County, Kansas
Gated communities in Kansas